Ukleja may refer to:

 Ukleja (river), a river in Poland
 Mick Ukleja (born 1948), American author

See also